Deheubarthia was a genus of Early Devonian land plant with branching axes.

A cladogram published in 2004 by Crane et al. places Deheubarthia in the core of a paraphyletic stem group of broadly defined "zosterophylls", basal to the lycopsids (living and extinct clubmosses and relatives).

References

External links
 Cladogram from 

Silurian plants
Devonian plants
Zosterophylls
Prehistoric lycophyte genera